Cynaeda rebeli is a moth in the family Crambidae. It was described by Hans Georg Amsel in 1935. It is found in the Palestinian territories.

References

Moths described in 1935
Odontiini